Miyake may refer to:

Places
 Miyake, Nara, a town located in Kansai
 Miyake, Tokyo, a village located in Tokyo
 Miyakejima, an island in the Izu Islands, often shortened to Miyake
 Miyakezaka, a neighborhood in Chiyoda, Tokyo, often shortened to Miyake
 Miyakezaka JCT, a junction in Shuto Expressway

Other uses
 Miyake (surname)
 Miyake event, year 774–775 and other exceptional carbon-14 spikes